Yukihikous minobusanus is a species of beetle in the family Carabidae, the only species in the genus Yukihikous.

References

Platyninae